Fran Jeffries (born Frances Ann Makris; May 18, 1937 – December 15, 2016) was an American singer, dancer, actress, and model.

Early life
Jeffries was born Frances Ann Makris on May 18, 1937, in Palo Alto, California, the daughter of Esther A. (née Gautier) and Steven G. Makris, a Greek-immigrant barbershop owner.

Career
Jeffries's film debut came in the 1958 film The Buccaneer. She appeared in the 1963 film The Pink Panther, in which she sang "Meglio Stasera (It Had Better Be Tonight)" while leading a line-dance with Peter Sellers, David Niven, and others. Her supporting role as a professional entertainer in Sex and the Single Girl featured her as a singer-dancer.

She sang on The Tom Jones Show in 1969 with the host, doing a duet of "You've Got What it Takes," as well as The Smokey Robinson Show the following year, in which she did solo numbers as well as a duet with Smokey Robinson and Stevie Wonder and the rest of the cast.

For a year, Jeffries sang with Bob Scobey's orchestra, and while she was married to Dick Haymes, they had a nightclub act together.

She was featured in Playboy in the February 1971 issue (Volume 18 Number 2) at the age of 33 in a pictorial titled "Fran-tastic!" In September 1982 she posed a second time for Playboy, this time at the age of 45. This second pictorial (Volume 29 Number 9) was titled "Still Fran-tastic!"

Personal life
Jeffries was in (at least) four marriages. Jeffries married the pianist Ed Belasco in 1955; they were divorced in 1957. She and the singer Dick Haymes married in 1958 and divorced in 1964. The couple had a daughter, Stephanie (b. 1959). She was also married to the director Richard Quine (1965-1970) and Steven Schaeffer (1971-1973).

Death
Jeffries died from multiple myeloma on December 15, 2016, in Los Angeles, California, at the age of 79.

Filmography

Discography
"Sex and the Single Girl" was released on MGM in 1964 as a single and an LP. She also sang the songs "Meglio Stasera" and "The Anniversary Song" in films.  In 1966, Jeffries recorded an album for Monument Records entitled This Is Fran Jeffries, which was a collection of standards and popular songs, produced by Fred Foster with arrangements by Dick Grove and Bill Justis, including a rendition of Lennon–McCartney's "Yesterday". In 2000, she released a recording All the Love, again a collection of standards.

Albums

Singles

References

External links
 
 Timeline
 

1937 births
2016 deaths
Actresses from the San Francisco Bay Area
American film actresses
American women singers
American people of Greek descent
Deaths from multiple myeloma
Deaths from cancer in California
MGM Records artists
Monument Records artists
20th-century American actresses
21st-century American women